Piz Minor is a mountain of the Livigno Alps, located in Graubünden, Switzerland. Its 3,049 metre high summit overlooks the Livigno Pass on its eastern side.

References

External links
 Piz Minor on Hikr

Mountains of Switzerland
Mountains of Graubünden
Mountains of the Alps
Alpine three-thousanders